Solace is the second album from Australian roots musician Xavier Rudd, released in Australia on 28 March 2004 and which debuted in the top twenty of the ARIA album chart on 5 April 2004. It is his first record distributed by a major label with distribution by Universal Music Australia. Solaces success earned Rudd two ARIA Music Awards nominations for Best Breakthrough Artist (album) and Best Blues and Roots Album at the 2005 ceremony, but lost to Jet's Get Born and John Butler Trio's Sunrise Over Sea, respectively.

Conception and production
The album was recorded entirely on his own featuring his guitar, several didgeridoos, a wooden box, an array of slide and acoustic guitars and percussion instruments. It was recorded in Vancouver. His personal friend and producer, Todd Simko, helped him through the recording.

Songs
The second song, "3 Degrees" is a short track about a time where Rudd describes an event that took place in Nashville, Tennessee. The ninth song, "A Fourth World", was played by Rudd in front of live crowd and told them he did not have a name for it yet. After the show a fan went up to him and said he thought he had a good name for the song. He said "a fourth world" because there is a third world, but "there's also a fourth world where people who don't have an existence, who are sort of trapped."

The eleventh song, "No Woman No Cry", is a cover of Bob Marley's 1975 song. While on tour with Melissa Ferrick he was struck by her performance of "No Woman No Cry". He decided to record his own version that would recapture the melancholy he experienced from hearing Melissa's version. Two songs, "Shelter" and "Let Me Be", were released as singles in Australia.

"Let Me Be" was ranked number 54 on the Triple J Hottest 100, 2003, while "Shelter" was ranked 56 and "Solace" 59 on the Triple J Hottest 100, 2004.

Track listing

Personnel

Music
Xavier Rudd – guitar, harmonica, drums, vocals, didjeridu, bells, slide guitar, djembe, shaker, slide banjo, Aztec drum, guitar (12 string electric), stomp box, guitar (12 string acoustic)
Todd Simko – banjo, shaker, Omnichord

Production
Producer: Xavier Rudd
Assistant producer: Todd Simko
Engineers: Xavier Rudd, Todd Simko
Mixing: Todd Simko
Mastering: Gavin Lurssen

Charts

Certifications

References

External links
 Undercover review

2004 albums
Xavier Rudd albums